Stuart Hughes (born June 9, 1959) is a Canadian actor known for his leading roles on the stages of many Canadian theatre companies, including Shaw Festival, Stratford Festival and Soulpepper Theatre Company (of which he is a founding member).

Education 
As a teenager, Hughes lived in London, Ontario, where he attended Saunders Secondary School and played French horn and violin in the school orchestra and band. He performed in school drama productions and also had roles in plays at Theatre London.

Career 
Hughes has received many award nominations for his work in film and television, and on stage. He has received three Dora Awards for the roles of Billy in The Collected Works of Billy the Kid, The Man in On the Verge (Tarragon Theatre) and Kit Carson in The Time Of Your Life (Soulpepper). He received an ACTRA Award for his lead role in the film The Drawer Boy.

He appeared in Mayday season 12 episode 1, as Commandant James Gibson (2012). He also played Oscar "Butch" Bowers in the 2017 film version of It.

Filmography

Film

Television

References

External links

1959 births
Living people
Canadian male film actors
Canadian male television actors
Dora Mavor Moore Award winners
Canadian male stage actors
Place of birth missing (living people)